The  is the smallest denomination of the Japanese yen currency. Historically they were initially made of both silver and gold in the early 1870s. Issues facing the Japanese government at the time included wanting to adopt the gold standard, and competing against the Mexican dollar for use in foreign trade. The decision was made to use silver one yen coins exclusively outside of Japan for trade, while gold coins were minted and used in mainland Japan. Gold and silver coins were eventually allowed to co-circulate in mainland Japan from 1878 to 1897 when they were demonetized. Millions of former one yen silver coins were countermarked by the Japanese government for use outside of the mainland. Silver one yen coins continued to be minted until 1914 for backing up currency.

One yen coins were not made again until after World War II in the late 1940s for a brief period of time. The current one yen coin design was first minted in 1955, is made up of pure aluminium, and has a young tree design which has been used since. In the early 2010s increasing usage of electronic money led to a lack of demand, and production of the coin was confined to mint sets until 2014. Regular production only lasted until 2016, when new one yen coins were again confined only to mint sets. Like with the U.S. penny, the Japan Mint has minted one-yen coins at a loss due to the rising cost of the base metal used in the coins.

History

Early yen (1870–1914)
The first Japanese one-yen coins were minted between 1871 and 1872 using both silver and gold alloys. This came at a time when a new decimal system was put into place, and a modern mint was established at Osaka. The yen was officially adopted by the Meiji government in an act signed on June 27, 1871. While silver one yen coins are dated 1870, this indicates their mintage date at the San Francisco Mint as the coins were not issued until the following year. Gold one yen coins dated 1871 were not minted until 1872 at the newly formed Osaka mint. No silver one yen coins were struck in 1873 as the year was devoted to turning out gold pieces domestically. The exclusive minting of gold coins during this time was reflective of the Japanese government's wish to switch to the gold standard in order to keep up with countries in North America and Europe. The Japanese government eventually came to the conclusion that issuing silver one yen coins alongside standard gold coins was in the best interest of foreign trade. Silver one yen coinage was resumed in 1874 for use outside of Japan to compete with the silver Mexican dollar. 

During the same year gold bullion rose to a slight premium which caused gold coin production as a whole to rapidly fall off. It was reported in the Quarterly Journal of Economics that by 1876 more gold coins were exported to foreign countries than for use domestically. Gold coinage finally came to an end in 1877 as the Japanese government was forced off the gold standard due to the cost of the Satsuma Rebellion. Japan ultimately chose to go with a bimetallic standard in 1878, which gave the one yen silver coin legal tender status throughout the country. From 1878 to 1897, large amounts of one yen coins were struck as the declining price of silver increased their demand. The fluctuations over the price of silver eventually made trade with Europe and the United States unreliable. 

After years of advisement, the Japanese government officially switched back to the gold standard on October 1, 1897 as a solution to the trading problem. Silver one yen coins were thus officially demonetized with granted leeway time until July 31, 1898 for those wanting to trade the coins for gold. The remaining silver coins in circulation were then either melted down to provide bullion for subsidiary coins, or were countermarked "Gin" for use in Japanese-occupied Taiwan, Korea, and Lüshunkou. Silver one yen coins were not stuck again until 1901 when they served as a reserve fund for "Bank of Formosa" notes. Due to the fluctuations in price between silver and gold, this practice came to an end in 1904. The production of silver one yen coins eventually ended in 1914 during the 3rd year of Emperor Taishō's reign.

Modern yen (1948–)
Japanese coinage was reformed in 1948 with the issue of a brass one-yen coin. 451,170,000 coins were minted until production stopped in 1950. The obverse of these brass coins features a numeral "1" with "State of Japan" above, and the date below, while the reverse reads "One Yen" with a floral pattern below it. The current aluminium coin was first introduced in 1955 with a floral design. The obverse has a young tree, intended to symbolize the healthy growth of Japan. The reverse side of the coin has a figure "1" in a circle that represents one yen; below the digit is the year of issue which is written in kanji. The one yen coin remains the oldest modern denomination coin with an unchanged design; throughout its minting history the coin was fully halted only once in 1968 due to excessive production. In 1989 a national consumption tax (set at 3%) was put into place resulting in many prices that were not multiples of 5 or 10 yen, causing the Japan Mint to produce one yen coins in huge amounts.

This consumption tax rate was raised in 1997 to 5%, reducing demand for the coin. By the turn of the century other factors such as rising metal costs and increasing usage of electronic money began to come into play. It was reported in 2003 that it cost 13 yen for the mint to produce a rolled plate for one yen coins. The rising price of aluminum had started to generate a commercial loss for the Japan Mint. In 2009, unsuccessful measures that included raising money from the private sector were tried in order to lower the cost. From 2011 to 2013 the Ministry of Finance stopped issuing new one yen coins for circulation. There was a small production run of 500,000 to 700,000 coins in mint sets for coin collectors. Production resumed in 2014 when the consumption tax was raised again to 8%, causing sums to be less rounded. The cost of producing each one yen coin was reported to be 3 yen as early as 2015. In the following year, more cashless transactions caused the ministry to stop issuing new one yen coins for circulation again. No coins have been made since 2016 apart from those in collectable mint sets.

One-yen coins have also seen non monetary usage; since all 1-yen coins weigh just one gram, they are sometimes used as weights. If placed carefully on the surface of still water, 1-yen coins will not break surface tension and thus can also float.

Elimination proposal & public opinion
On February 25, 2021 CDP leader Kenta Izumi proposed to abolish 1 and 5-yen coins due to the fee involved with depositing them at banks. Izumi's issue was that a fee of 550 yen is incurred at most major banks for deposits involving 101 coins or more. Taro Aso, who was at the time the Minister of Finance pushed back on the notion stating "we have no plans to abolish it immediately" as there is a demand for small value transactions. It was reported in October 2017 that one yen coins remained popular in places like Osaka, where the coins are traditionally used for these types of merchant transactions. 

According to correspondent Leo Lewis of the Financial Times, the overall use of cash will not be "broken easily" in Japan. Lewis says that elderly Japanese people have not been eager for innovation, and conditions such as "low street crime, low interest rates and a reduced threshold on inheritance tax" remain in place that increase the appeal of carrying cash.

Types and specifications

Circulation figures

Meiji
The following are circulation figures for the coins minted between the 3rd and the 45th and last year of Emperor Meiji's reign. Coins for this period all begin with the Japanese symbol 明治 (Meiji). One yen trade dollars, minor varieties, and patterns are not included here. Countermarked yen ("Gin") are included in the original mintage totals.

Inscriptions on Japanese coins from this period are read clockwise from right to left: 
"Year" ← Number representing year of reign ← Emperor's name (e.g. 年 ← 五十三 ← 治明)

Gold

Silver

Taishō
The following is a circulation figure for coins that were minted during the 3rd year of Taishō's reign. Coins from this period all begin with the Japanese symbol 大正 (Taishō). This was the final year one yen coins were minted in silver, and is a one year type.

Inscriptions on Japanese coins from this period are read clockwise from right to left: 
"Year" ← Number representing year of reign ← Emperor's name (Ex: 年 ← 三十 ← 正大)

Shōwa

The following are circulation dates which cover Emperor Showa's (Hirohito's) reign. The dates below correspond to the 23rd to the 64th (last) years of his reign. Inscriptions on coins for this period all begin with the kanji characters 昭和 (Shōwa).

These coins are read from left to right:
Emperor's name → Number representing year of reign → "Year" (Ex: 昭和 → 六十二 → 年).

Heisei

The following are circulation dates during the reign of Emperor Akihito (Heisei), who reigned from 1989 until his abdication in April 2019. The first year of his reign is marked with a 元 symbol on the coin as a one year type. Coins for this period all begin with the kanji characters 平成 (Heisei). One-yen coins dated between 2011 and 2013 were only released in mint sets. Mintage was briefly resumed in 2014 only for it to be halted again in 2016. No one yen coins were released for circulation for the remainder of Heisei's reign.

These coins are read with from left to right:
Emperor's name → Number representing year of reign → "Year" (e.g. 平成 → 九 → 年).

Reiwa
The following are circulation dates in the reign of the current Emperor. Naruhito acceded to the Chrysanthemum Throne on May 1, 2019 and he was formally enthroned on October 22, 2019. Coins for this period all begin with the kanji characters 令和 (Reiwa). The inaugural year coin (2019) was marked 元 (first) and debuted during the summer of that year. One yen coins have not been minted for circulation since 2015. Those that are minted are intended for collectors who purchase them from the Japan Mint at a premium.

These coins are read from left to right:
Emperor's name → Number representing year of reign → Year (e.g. 令和 → 元 → 年).

Notes

References

External links 

 Circulating coin list -Japan Mint.

Japanese yen coins
One-base-unit coins